Peter Goodrich is a Professor of Law at the Benjamin N. Cardozo School of Law, Yeshiva University. He is the managing editor of Law and Literature and serves on the editorial board of Law and Critique. He is co-editor of the critical legal studies book series 'Discourses of Law' published by Routledge. Peter Goodrich was one of the founding academic staff in the Birkbeck Law School.

Goodrich has been at Cardozo Law School since 2000 and teaches courses in Contracts, Jurisprudence, Film and Law, and Gender and Law. He obtained his LL.B. in 1975 from the University of Sheffield and his Ph.D. in 1984 from the University of Edinburgh with the thesis 'Legal discourse : studies in linguistics, rhetoric and legal analysis'. This was also published as a book by Macmillan, London, 1987. His scholarly work is wide ranging in its engagement with questions of law, interpretation, history, institution, rhetoric, visuality, and aesthetics.

Published work

Monographs
 Reading the Law : A Critical Introduction to Legal Method and Techniques. Oxford: B. Blackwell (1986). .
 Legal Discourse : Studies in Linguistics, Rhetoric and Legal Analysis. London: Macmillan (1987). .
 Languages of Law : From Logics of Memory to Nomadic Masks. London: Weidenfeld and Nicolson (1990). .
 Oedipus Lex : Psychoanalysis, History, Law. Berkeley: University of California Press (1995). .
 Law in the Courts of Love : Literature and Other Minor Jurisprudences. London: Routledge (1996). .
 The Laws of Love : A Brief Historical and Practical Manual. Basingstoke: Palgrave Macmillan (2006). .
Legal Emblems and the Art of Law : Obiter Depicta as the Vision of Governance. New York: Cambridge University Press (2013). .
 Imago Decidendi: On the Common Law of Images. Leiden: Brill (2017). 
 Schreber's Law: Jurisprudence and Judgment in Transition. Edinburgh: Edinburgh University Press (2018). .

Selected editorial work 
(edited with Costas Douzinas and Yifat Hachamovitch) Politics, Postmodernity and Critical Legal Studies: The Legality of the Contingent, Routledge, 1994, .
(edited with Mariana Valverde) Nietzsche and Legal Theory: Half-Written Laws, Routledge, 2005, .
(edited with Lior Barshack) Law Text Terror, Routledge-Cavendish, 2006, .
Note: a paperback edition followed six months later, with Anton Schutz as a third editor. 
(edited with Valérie Hayaert) Genealogies of Legal Vision, Routledge, 2016, .

External links
 Homepage

References

American legal scholars
Alumni of the University of Edinburgh
Cardozo School of Law faculty
Living people
Alumni of the University of Sheffield
Year of birth missing (living people)